Arthur Goldman may refer to:

 Arthur E. Goldman (born 1953), NASA director
 Arthur Goldman (cricketer) (1868–1937), Australian cricketer